Lokeswaram is a village in Nirmal district of the Indian state of Telangana.

References 

Villages in Nirmal district